Bhaskara Malla (also known as Mahindrasimha Malla) (Nepali: भास्कर मल्ल) was a Malla ruler and the twelfth king of Kantipur. He succeeded his father Bhupalendra Malla in 1700 as the King of Kantipur and also ruled Patan under the name Mahindrasimha Malla from 1717 until his death in 1722.

Reign

Kantipur 
Bhaskara Malla became the King of Kantipur when he was 14 years old. His mother Bhuwanalakshmi acted as the regent until he came of age and maintained friendly relations with neighboring kingdoms of Patan, and Bhadgaon. Bhaskara Malla once went to an expedition in Terai and captured several elephants. After that he assumed the title of Gajapati.

Patan 
After the death of Riddhi Narasimha Malla of Patan in 1717, there were no any legitimate heirs. The Kajis of Patan wanted Ranajit Malla, the then heir apparent of Bhadgaon, to take over as the King of Patan. Due to the influence of Yogamati,, Bhaskara Malla was proclaimed as the king. He issued coins under the name Gajapati Mahindra Simha.

Conflicts 
Bhaskara Malla lived a lavish lifestyle and had allowed luxurious muslims of Indian origin to settle in Kantipur. This act was not taken well by the ministers and the public who were mostly Newars and Khas. He even appointed a Muslim as his minister which resulted in an uprising in which many Muslims were killed and he sent away all the foreigners.

The Kajis of Patan were also unhappy with his rule and were in constant conflicts with him.

Plague 
An epidemic had broke out during the reign of Bhaskara Malla which lasted for 2–3 years and killed approximately 20,000 people. During this time Jhangal Kaji Thakuri kept the king and his two wives at Kindolbahal, near Swayambhunath. After six months of confinement, he inquired about the plague and got assurances that the death rate had fallen significantly. He returned to his palace and died due to the plague in 1722.

Succession 
Bhaskara Malla was childless and had nominated Jagajjaya Malla, the grandson of Mahipatendra Malla, as his heir of Kantipur. His two queens and two concubines went Sati on his funeral pyre. He was succeeded by Yoga Prakash Malla in Patan.

References

Notes

Sources 

Malla rulers of Kantipur
Malla rulers of Lalitpur
18th-century Nepalese people
Nepalese monarchs
1722 deaths